Aurantiacicella is a myxol-producing, Gram-negative, aerobic, rod-shaped, mesophilic and non-motile genus of bacteria from the family of Flavobacteriaceae with one known species (Aurantiacicella marina). Aurantiacicella marina has been isolated from seawater from the Muroto city in Japan.

References

Flavobacteria
Bacteria genera
Monotypic bacteria genera
Taxa described in 2016